Soltero en el aire (English title:Single in the air) is a Mexican telenovela produced by Humberto Navárro for Televisa in 1984. It starred Óscar Bonfiglio, Sergio DeFassio, Pilar Delgado, Frank Moro and Grace Renat.

Cast 
Óscar Bonfiglio
Sergio DeFassio
Pilar Delgado
Frank Moro
Grace Renat

References

External links

Mexican telenovelas
1984 telenovelas
1984 Mexican television series debuts
1985 Mexican television series endings
Televisa telenovelas
Spanish-language telenovelas